Le Mistral, or the Mistral, was an express train between Paris and Nice in France.  Introduced in 1950, it was operated by the Société Nationale des Chemins de fer français ("French National Railway Corporation") (SNCF), and was regarded as the company's flagship train.

The train was named after the Mistral, a strong, cold and usually dry regional wind blowing from north or northwestern France to the coast of the Mediterranean around the Camargue region.

History
The Mistral began its existence in 1950 as a mostly steam locomotive-hauled Rapide (express train) between Paris-Gare de Lyon and Marseille-Saint-Charles.  Two years later, in 1952, its route was extended to Nice-Ville.  By 1965, when it was integrated into the Trans Europ Express (TEE) system, it had become completely electric locomotive-hauled.

In the 1970s, Le Mistral included some unique amenities, among them a "bookstall, bar and hairdressing salon".  The train also had two restaurant cars; the Wagons-Lits Company provided the on-board catering.  In 1975, a writer for Fodor's called Le Mistral "perhaps the most luxurious train in Europe".

The train's final day as a TEE was 26 September 1981, as the next day saw the introduction of the first TGV service in France, in that same corridor, and the downgrading of Le Mistral to a two-class "Rapide" train, albeit continuing to use the same first-class coaches for the train's first-class section.

Le Mistral was discontinued entirely in 1982, after being replaced by TGV service.

Speed
It also had the distinction of being the train with the "world's fastest schedule for [a route of] over 500 miles", averaging  on its  Paris – Marseille section. Soon after that, electrification of the route was completed, and Le Mistral began being hauled by modern electric locomotives; starting in 1969, it was Class CC 6500 locomotives. This change along with new passenger coaches increased the train's average speed and shortened the travel time, the latter going from 10 hours, 21 minutes, in 1964 to just over 9 hours in June 1969.

See also

 History of rail transport in France
 List of named passenger trains of Europe

References

Notes

Bibliography

 
 
 
 
  

Named passenger trains of France
Trans Europ Express
Railway services introduced in 1950